Jonathon Acosta (born November 3, 1989) is an American politician and academic serving as a member of the Rhode Island Senate from the 16th district. Elected in November 2020, he assumed office on January 5, 2021.

Early life and education 
Acosta was born in New York City in 1989. He earned a Bachelor of Arts degree in political science, Master of Arts in urban education policy, and Master of Arts in sociology from Brown University.

Career 
Acosta was a postdoctoral trainee at Brown University. From 2011 to 2013, he was an eighth grade math teacher in the Miami-Dade County Public Schools. From 2013 to 2017, he was a teacher and administrator at Blackstone Valley Prep Junior High School, a charter school in Central Falls, Rhode Island.

References 

Living people
1989 births
Democratic Party Rhode Island state senators
Brown University alumni
People from Central Falls, Rhode Island